Albert Marrin (born July 24, 1936) is an American historian, professor of history and author of more than forty juvenile non-fiction books.

Life
He was born in New York City. He graduated from City College of New York, Yeshiva University and Columbia University. He taught in the public schools New York City. He is chairman of the history department at Yeshiva University.

He lives with his wife in the Bronx, New York.

Awards
 2008 National Humanities Medal
 Carter G. Woodson Award
 Boston Globe/Horn Book Award
 Dorothy Canfield Fisher Children's Book Award
 James Madison Book Award
 Washington Post-Children's Book Guild Nonfiction Award.

Work
 The Church of England in the first world war, Columbia University., 1968
 Sir Norman Angell, Twayne Publishers, 1979, 
 The airman's war: World War II in the sky, Atheneum, 1982, 
 Overlord: D-Day and the invasion of Europe, Atheneum, 1982, 
 Victory in the Pacific, Atheneum, 1983
 The sea rovers: pirates, privateers, and buccaneers, Atheneum, 1984, 
 War clouds in the West: Indians & cavalrymen, 1860-1890, Atheneum, 1984, 
 The secret armies: spies, counterspies, and saboteurs in World War II, Atheneum, 1985, 
 1812, the war nobody won, Atheneum, 1985, 
 Aztecs and Spaniards: Cortés and the conquest of Mexico, Atheneum, 1986, 
 The Yanks are coming: the United States in the first World War, Atheneum, 1986, 
 Hitler, Viking Kestrel, 1987, 
 Struggle for a Continent: The French and Indian Wars, 1690-1760, Atheneum, 1987, 
 The war for independence: the story of the American Revolution, Atheneum, 1988, 
 Inca & Spaniard: Pizarro and the conquest of Peru, Atheneum, 1989, 
 Mao Tse-tung and his China, Viking Kestrel, 1989, 
 The Spanish–American War, Atheneum, 1991, 
 America and Vietnam: the elephant and the tiger, Viking, 1992, 
 Stalin Puffin Books, 1993, 
 Napoleon and the Napoleonic Wars, Puffin Books, 1993, 
 Cowboys, Indians, and gunfighters: the story of the cattle kingdom, Atheneum, 1993, 
 Virginia's general: Robert E. Lee and the Civil War, Atheneum, 1994, 
 Unconditional surrender: U.S. Grant and the Civil War, Atheneum, 1994, 
 The sea king: Sir Francis Drake and his times, Atheneum Books for Young Readers, 1995, 
 Plains warrior: Chief Quanah Parker and the Comanches, Atheneum Books for Young Readers, 1996, 
 Commander in Chief Abraham Lincoln and the Civil War, Dutton Children's Books, 1997, 
 Empires lost and won: the Spanish heritage in the Southwest, Atheneum Books for Young Readers, 1997, 
 Terror of the Spanish Main: Sir Henry Morgan and his buccaneers, Dutton Children's Books, 1999, 
 Sitting Bull and his world, Dutton Children's Books, 2000, 
 George Washington and the founding of a nation, Dutton Children's Books, 2001, 
 Dr. Jenner and the speckled monster: the search for the smallpox vaccine, Dutton Children's Books, 2002, 
 Secrets from the rocks: dinosaur hunting with Roy Chapman Andrews, Illustrator Albert Marrin, Dutton Children's Books, 2002, 
 Old Hickory: Andrew Jackson and the American People, Dutton Children's Books, 2004, 
 Oh, Rats!: the story of rats and people, Illustrator C. B. Mordan, Dutton Children's Books, 2006, 
 Saving the Buffalo, Scholastic Nonfiction, 2006, 
 Commander and Chief: Abraham Lincoln and the Civil War, 2007
 The Great Adventure: Theodore Roosevelt and the Rise of Modern America, Dutton Children's Books, 2008, 
 Years of Dust: The Story of the Dust Bowl, 2009
 Flesh and Blood So Cheap: The Triangle Fire and its Legacy, 2011
 Little Monsters: The Creatures That Live on Us and in Us, 2011
 Black Gold: The Story of Oil in Our Lives, 2012
 A Volcano Beneath the Snow: John Brown's War Against Slavery, 2014
 Thomas Paine, Crusader for Liberty: How One Man's Ideas Helped Form a New Nation, 2014
 FDR and the American Crisis, 2015
 Uprooted: The Japanese American Experience During World War II, 2016
 Very, Very, Very Dreadful: The Influenza Pandemic of 1918, 2018
 A Light in the Darkness: Janusz Korczak, His Orphans, and the Holocaust, 2019
 A Time of Fear: America in the Era of Red Scares and Cold War, 2021

References

External links
"Author's website"

1936 births
20th-century American historians
American male non-fiction writers
American children's writers
Carter G. Woodson Book Award winners
City College of New York alumni
Columbia University alumni
Living people
National Humanities Medal recipients
Yeshiva University alumni
Yeshiva University faculty
20th-century American male writers